Lee Ki-je (born July 9, 1991) is a South Korean football player who plays for Suwon Samsung.

International career
He made his debut for South Korea national football team on 5 June 2021 in a World Cup qualifier against Turkmenistan.

Club statistics
As of 11 March 2023

Honours

Club
 Ulsan Hyundai
 KFA Cup: 2017

Individual
K League 1 Best XI: 2021
K League 1 top assist provider: 2022

Notes

References

External links

1991 births
Living people
People from Changnyeong County
Sportspeople from South Gyeongsang Province
Association football fullbacks
South Korean footballers
South Korea international footballers
South Korea youth international footballers
South Korean expatriate footballers
J1 League players
A-League Men players
K League 1 players
Shimizu S-Pulse players
Newcastle Jets FC players
Ulsan Hyundai FC players
Suwon Samsung Bluewings players
Expatriate footballers in Japan
South Korean expatriate sportspeople in Japan
Expatriate soccer players in Australia
South Korean expatriate sportspeople in Australia
Dongguk University alumni